Events from the year 1947 in Belgium

Incumbents
Monarch: Leopold III, with Prince Charles as regent
Prime Minister: 
 Camille Huysmans (to 20 March)
 Paul-Henri Spaak (from 20 March)

Events
 13 March – Camille Huysmans proffers his resignation as prime minister.

Publications
 Marnix Gijsen (ed.), Belgium under Occupation (New York, Moretus Press for the Belgian Government Information Center)
 Robert E. Merriam, Dark December: The Full Account of the Battle of the Bulge (Chicago, Ziff-Davis)
 Georges Simenon, Maigret se fâche

Births
 1 April – Philippe Kirsch, Belgian-born Canadian lawyer and judge
 19 April – Claude Laverdure, writer (died 2020)

Deaths
 9 February — Anna Kernkamp (born 1868), artist
 8 September – Victor Horta (born 1861), architect

References

 
Belgium
Years of the 20th century in Belgium
1940s in Belgium
Belgium